This page documents all tornadoes confirmed by various weather forecast offices of the National Weather Service in the United States in May 2019. Tornado counts are considered preliminary until final publication in the database of the National Centers for Environmental Information.

United States yearly total

May

May 1 event

May 2 event

May 3 event

May 4 event

May 5 event

May 6 event

May 7 event

May 8 event

May 9 event

May 11 event

May 12 event

May 13 event

May 17 to May 30 events

A total of 400 tornadoes touched down in the United States during this extended tornado outbreak sequence.

May 31 event

See also
 Tornadoes of 2019
 List of United States tornadoes in April 2019
 List of United States tornadoes from June to August 2019

Notes

References 

2019 natural disasters in the United States
2019-related lists
Tornadoes of 2019
Tornadoes
2019, 1